The 1997–98 season was Ulster Rugby's third season under professionalism, during which they competed in the Heineken Cup and the IRFU Interprovincial Championship.

The IRFU offered new contracts for provincial players for this season. Full-time players would receive a retainer of £25,000, plus a win bonus of £500 for Heineken Cup matches. Part-time players would be paid a retainer of £7,500, plus a match fee of £400 for Interprovincial matches and £800 for the Heineken Cup, and a win bonus of £450 for both competitions. Each province could have a maximum of 30 contracted players.

Mark McCall was offered a full-time contract, but turned it down and signed for London Irish, making him unavailable for Ulster this season.

Full-time contracts were also offered to Jan Cunningham and Stephen Bell, and part-time contracts to Clem Boyd (Bedford), Sheldon Coulter (Ballymena), Bryn Cunningham (Bective), Stuart Duncan (Malone), Rab Irwin (Ballymena), Stuart Laing (Portadown), Gary Leslie (Dungannon), Gary Longwell (Ballymena), Richard Mackey (Malone), Andrew Matchett (Ballymena), Denis McBride (Malone), Dean Macartney (Ballymena), Stephen McKinty (Bangor), Tony McWhirter (Ballymena), John Patterson (Dungannon) and Andy Ward (Ballynahinch).

After the departure of Tony Russ, Clive Griffiths was lined up to take over as head coach, but withdrew in the summer. Davy Haslett, a geography teacher at RBAI, was offered the position on the eve of the 1997 Ireland A rugby union tour of Oceania, on which he was assistant coach. Between returning from that tour and a pre-booked famility holiday, he only had four weeks to work with the team before the season started. Charlie McAleese was appointed assistant coach, and John Kinnear team manager.

Players selected

1997–98 Heineken Cup

Pool 2

1997–98 IRFU Interprovincial Championship

Top three teams qualify for next season's Heineken Cup.

Friendlies

Ulster Rugby Awards
The inaugural Guinness Ulster Rugby Awards dinner was held on 20 May 1998 at the Balmoral Conference Centre. Winners were:

Player of the year: Andy Ward
Personality of the year: Andy Ward
Club of the year: Ballynahinch RFC
Coach of the year: Charlie McAleese, Dromore High School
Youth player of the year: Diarmuid O'Kane, St Colman's College, Newry
Schools player of the year: Andy Hughes, Royal School Dungannon
Dorrington B. Faulkner Memorial Award: Ken Reid, former IRFU president and Ireland team manager

References

1997-98
1997–98 in Irish rugby union
1997–98 Heineken Cup